The president of the Regional Council of Veneto is the presiding officer of the Regional Council of Veneto. The office is established by the articles 10 and 11 of the Statute of Veneto. The president is elected by the absolute majority of the Regional Council in the first session of the new legislature and his term ends at the end of the legislature.

The current president is Roberto Ciambetti of Liga Veneta–Lega.

List
Source: Regional Council of Veneto

References

Veneto
Presidents
Politics of Veneto